Mastering Witchcraft: A Practical Guide for Witches, Warlocks and Covens is a book written by Paul Huson and published in 1970 by G.P. Putnams- the first mainstream publisher to produce a do-it-yourself manual for the would-be witch or warlock.

The book has been described as one of the main motivators of the so-called "occult explosion" of the 1970s;  it was regarded as one of the chief sources of information and ritual for non-Wiccan and non-feminist witchcraft.

References

Further references to Mastering Witchcraft and witchcraft

Clifton, Chas S., Her Hidden Children: The Rise of Wicca and Paganism in America, Lanham, MD: Rowman Altamira, 2006, . 
Farrar, Stewart, Eight Sabbats for Witches, .
Lewis, James R. (ed), Magical Religion and Modern Witchcraft, Baker, James W., "White Witches: Historic Fact and Romantic Fantasy", Albany: State University of New York Press, 1996, .
Skelton, Robin, Spellcraft, Toronto: McClelland and Stewart, 1978, .
Luhrmann, T.M., Persuasions of the Witch's Craft, Cambridge, Massachusetts: Harvard University Press, 1989, .
Valiente, Doreen, The Rebirth of Witchcraft, London: Robert Hale, 1989, .

1970 non-fiction books
Occult books
Modern witchcraft